Shalyn Walker, better known as Luvli, is an American singer and songwriter from Chicago, Illinois.

She was featured on Aaron Smith's hit single "Dancin'" which hit the UK top 40 in January 2006.
Dancin featured remixes by JJ Flores & Steve Smooth.

The single reached the top 10 of the Billboard Hot Dance Airplay chart in early 2006. 

In 2019, "Dancin'" was certified Silver by the British Phonographic Industry (BPI), followed by Gold in 2021 and Platinum in 2022.

References

External links 

American dance musicians
Living people
Year of birth missing (living people)
21st-century African-American women singers
21st-century American women singers
African-American women singer-songwriters
21st-century American singers